Tomáš Ďurica (born 29 January 1979) is a Slovak football midfielder who currently plays for MŠK Žilina B - Kotrčina Lúčka.

References

External links

1979 births
Living people
Slovak footballers
Association football midfielders
MŠK Žilina players
FC Dynamo Moscow reserves players
FK Dubnica players
MŠK Púchov players
ŠK Eldus Močenok players
FK Fotbal Třinec players
Slovak Super Liga players
Expatriate footballers in Russia
Expatriate footballers in the Czech Republic